Tappeh Maki (also Romanized as Tappeh Mākī and Tappeh Makī; also known as Tappeh Mākū) is a village in Baranduzchay-ye Jonubi Rural District, in the Central District of Urmia County, West Azerbaijan Province, Iran. At the 2006 census, its population was 303, in 84 families.

References 

Populated places in Urmia County